East Richford is an unincorporated community in the town of Richford, Franklin County, Vermont, United States.

Notes

Unincorporated communities in Franklin County, Vermont
Unincorporated communities in Vermont